Connect may refer to:

Music

Albums
Connect (album), an album by Australian rock band Sick Puppies
Connect, album by  Mark Farina
Tha Connect, a 2009 album by Willy Northpole
Connect, a 2009 album by Dave Schulz (musician)
Connect Sets (disambiguation), several album series

Songs
"Connect" (ClariS song)
"Connect", a song by Sick Puppies from their 2013 album Connet
"Connect", song by Drake from the 2013 album Nothing Was the Same

Other music
Connect Music Festival, a music festival in Inveraray, Scotland
Sony Connect, an online music store

Other entertainment
 Connect, a matching game similar to dominoes, also known as Rivers, Roads & Rails
Connect (sculpture), a public art work by Jeremy Wolf installed Milwaukee, Wisconsin, United States
Connect (2019 film), a Scottish film
Connect (2022 film), an upcoming Tamil horror thriller film
Connect with Mark Kelley, a Canadian news talk show
Connect (TV series), South Korean TV series

Cars
Connect (Alfa Romeo), control system
Ford Tourneo Connect, a vehicle manufactured in the UK by Ford
Ford Transit Connect, a vehicle manufactured in the UK by Ford

Computing and technology
 Connect (computer system), HMRC data mining database system (UK)
CONNECT (HTTP), the request method of the Hypertext Transfer Protocol
Communications, Navigation, and Networking reConfigurable Testbed (CoNNeCT), a testbed for the Space Communications and Navigation Program  (SCaN) program on the International Space Station
CONNECT string, a Hayes modem command and response
 McGraw-Hill Connect, a web-based assignment and assessment platform that helps educators connect students to their coursework

Organizations
Connect (financial services company), a  consumer credit reporting agency in the United States
Connect (Irish trade union), a union for construction and technical workers in Ireland
Connect (organization), an independent non-profit organization servicing the San Diego region with offices in San Diego and Washington, D.C.
Connect (UK trade union), a union for technology workers in the United Kingdom
Connect (users group), the worldwide users group for Hewlett-Packard
Connect (insurance company), an American insurance company
Directorate-General for Communications Networks, Content and Technology, or Connect, a department of the European Commission

Other uses
Connect (horse), a grade 1 winning thoroughbred
Connect (studio), a Japanese anime studio

See also
Kinect, a motion-sensing controller for video games
 Only Connect, a British BBC TV quiz show, first aired in 2008